Anna Michelle Peterson (born 12 September 1990) is a New Zealand former cricketer who played as an all-rounder, batting right-handed and bowling right-arm off break. She appeared in 32 One Day Internationals and 33 Twenty20 Internationals for New Zealand between 2012 and 2020. She played domestic cricket for Northern Districts, Auckland and Typhoons. She was the first cricketer for New Zealand to take a hat-trick in a Women's Twenty20 International. In October 2021, Peterson retired from international cricket, and in March 2022 she retired from all forms of cricket.

Career
She made her WODI debut on 1 March 2012 against England and scored crucial 33 runs on debut by batting down the order. She made her WT20I debut on 24 February 2015 against England.

On 19 February 2017, she took a hat-trick during the second Women's Twenty20 International match against Australia. She completed her hat-trick by claiming the wickets on first three balls of her spell in the match and her bowling figures were read at 0.3-0-0-3. Her bowling spell of 3/2 against Australia also propelled an unlikely victory for New Zealand in a low scoring affair after bowling out Australia cheaply for just 61 runs and New Zealand successfully defended 101 runs. Anna's hat-trick was also the first hat-trick for a New Zealand women's bowler in international cricket since 1996.

She was named in New Zealand's squad for the 2016 ICC Women's World Twenty20 tournament in India. She was named in New Zealand's squad for the 2017 Women's Cricket World Cup tournament in England. 

In October 2018, she was named in New Zealand's squad for the 2018 ICC Women's World Twenty20 tournament in the West Indies. In January 2020, she was named in New Zealand's squad for the 2020 ICC Women's T20 World Cup in Australia.

She also currently works at North Harbour Rugby as the rugby manager for both girls and women.

References

External links 
 
 

1990 births
Living people
New Zealand women cricketers
New Zealand women One Day International cricketers
New Zealand women Twenty20 International cricketers
Women's Twenty20 International cricket hat-trick takers
Northern Districts women cricketers
Auckland Hearts cricketers
Typhoons (women's cricket) cricketers